The Santa Cruz Wharf is a wharf in Santa Cruz, California, United States, known for fishing, boat tours, viewing sea lions, dining, nightlife and gift shops. The current wharf was built in 1914, the last of six built on the site, and is operated by the City of Santa Cruz Parks and Recreation Office. The wharf is situated between Main Beach (which is adjacent to the Santa Cruz Beach Boardwalk) and Cowell's Beach, on the westside of the city of Santa Cruz.

History

The Santa Cruz Wharf opened on December 5, 1914. The original purpose of building the wharf was for shipping potatoes to San Francisco for mining camps in the Sierra Nevada during the Gold Rush. After the innovation of motor vehicles and improved land routes, the Wharf's primary focus changed to be the base of the north Monterey Bay fishing industry. By the 1950s as Monterey Bay's sardine and other fish populations dwindled, nearly every family owned a vehicle and had money to spend on recreation. As a result, the Santa Cruz Wharf became predominantly a recreational destination. Today, the wharf is still a popular tourist attraction, nestled adjacent to the city's leading attraction, Santa Cruz Beach Boardwalk. Visitors flock to the wharf for a variety of restaurants, gift shops, wine tasting, candy stores, and just to stroll and peer down at the sea lions below. Annually, an estimated 1.5 million visitors come to the Santa Cruz Wharf to fish, shop, dine and sightsee.

On October 4, 2014, the community celebrated 100 years of the Santa Cruz Wharf with a festival including a pop-up museum exhibit, historic photo stand, bocce courts, face painting, Mavericks surfboard display, photo booth, Economic Development's Wharf Master Plan model and the Surfing Preservation Society's surf shack! The festivities ended with fireworks.

Events

Woodies on the Wharf
The Surf City Classic "Woodies on the Wharf" is Northern California's largest woodie show that features more than 200 stylish, pre-1952 wood-bodied cars. Admission is free. Music, woodie goodies and prize drawings are included. A free bike valet is available.

Wharf to Wharf
Each year, on the fourth Sunday in July, thousands of runners from across America and around the globe return to Santa Cruz, California for the annual six-mile race to Capitola-by-the-Sea. First run in 1973 by a handful of locals, the Wharf to Wharf Race begins at the Santa Cruz Wharf and completes at the Capitola Wharf, in the neighboring town. Limited to 16,000 runners on a first-come-first-served basis, its field sells out months in advance.

Popular culture 
A fish market on the wharf is featured in scenes from the film Sudden Impact (1983). A restaurant on the wharf is seen in The Lost Boys (1987).

See also
Casa del Rey Hotel

References

External links

City of Santa Cruz Wharf

1914 establishments in California
Piers in California
Santa Cruz, California
Transportation buildings and structures in Santa Cruz County, California
Tourist attractions in Santa Cruz County, California